Cypringlea is a genus of flowering plants belonging to the family Cyperaceae.

Its native range is Mexico.

Species:

Cypringlea analecta 
Cypringlea coahuilensis 
Cypringlea evadens

References

Cyperaceae
Cyperaceae genera